No Regrets About Youth is a 1992 film by Zhou Xiaowen.

The film explores the redevelopment of Beijing in the 1990s. In the film a bulldozer operator destroys a siheyuan courtyard house that is the residence of his girlfriend. Xiaoping Lin, author of Children of Marx and Coca-Cola: Chinese Avant-Garde Art and Independent Cinema, wrote that the scene compares the destruction of the house to a rape of a woman.

References
 Lin, Xiaoping. Children of Marx and Coca-Cola: Chinese Avant-Garde Art and Independent Cinema. University of Hawaii Press, 2010. , 9780824833367.

External links

1992 films
Chinese drama films
Films directed by Zhou Xiaowen